Rumex hastatulus, commonly known as the heartwing sorrel, is an annual flowering plant species in the family Polygonaceae otherwise known as the buckwheat family. It is found spread out through the eastern and southern United States.

Description 
The fruit is a brownish orange color. When eaten the leaves flowers and seeds have been described to have a sour taste and are edible in small doses.

Rumex hastatulus is dioecious, with separate male and female plants.

Distribution 
The plant is found in the eastern and southeastern parts of North America in areas with alluvial or ruderal habitats such as river valleys meadows and waste areas.

Uses 
While the culinary uses for the plant are limited due to it being known to cause nausea stomach cramps and headaches in large portions it is at times used in France as a form of "sorrel soup". The plant is also commonly used to study due to its unique genetic structure. Due to their complex chromosomal makeup their sex is determined by the ratio of x and y chromosomes. This gender determination system is unique in flowering plants leading to a lot of research being done into environmental and genetic factors in that determine the sex.

References

hastatulus
Dioecious plants